Arun Kumar Nehru (24 April 1944 – 25 July 2013) was an Indian politician and columnist. He was member of the 9th Lok Sabha from Bilhaur as a Janata Dal leader. Earlier, he was member of the 7th and 8th Lok Sabhas from Rae Bareli on an Indian National Congress ticket.

Personal life
Arun Nehru was born on 24 April 1944. His father was Anand Kumar Nehru, a member of the Nehru-Gandhi family. He studied at La Martinière Boys College, Lucknow, and Lucknow Christian College. He was married in 1967 to Subhadra and had two daughters. He has 3 grandsons. Akhil Madan, Yash Madan and Vickram Tikkoo. He died on 25 July 2013 in Gurgaon.

Career
He worked as a businessman for 17 years before entering into politics. He was president of the paint firm Jenson and Nicholson at the time when Prime Minister Indira Gandhi persuaded him to change career. However, he rose to prominence after Sanjay Gandhi's death. The business community regarded him as a decisive person and even termed him as "one-window clearance". When Rajiv Gandhi forayed into politics in 1981, Nehru became his key advisor.

As a representative of the Indian National Congress (INC), Nehru was a member of Parliament in the 7th Lok Sabha (1980–84) and 8th Lok Sabha (1984-89) from Rae Bareli. He was Union Minister of State for Energy (December 1984—September 1985,) and for Home Affairs (September 1985—October 1986) in 10th ministry of India. Later, he left the INC for Janata Dal and was elected to the 9th Lok Sabha from Bilhaur in 1989, where he was Union Minister for Commerce and Tourism (December–November 1990).

He was also a member of member of various committees - Railway Convention Committee (1980–84), Consultative Committee, External Affairs and Science and Technology, 7th Lok Sabha; Member, Consultative Committee, External Affairs (1987–89)

Controversies

Role in 1984 Anti-Sikh riots
As originally reported by The Caravan Magazine, Arun Nehru reportedly played a pivotal role in the 1984 anti-Sikh riots. The riots broke out after the Assassination of Indira Gandhi. According to then petroleum secretary Avtar Singh Gill, Rajiv Gandhi 's "errand boy", Lalit Suri informed him at the eve of the massacre that Arun Nehru gave "clearance" for the killings in Delhi.. His strategy was to "catch Sikh youth, fling a tyre over their heads, douse them with kerosene and set them on fire.". He further retorted,  "This will calm the anger of the Hindus".

Czech pistol case
A 20-year investigation by the Central Bureau of Investigation (CBI) led to submission of a report in 2007. This found no incriminating evidence. The trial court, however, rejected the CBI report and found Nehru's involvement enough to continue the proceedings. In March 2013, the Supreme Court stayed those proceedings, based on the report.

References

1944 births
2013 deaths
Journalists from Uttar Pradesh
Nehru–Gandhi family
Politicians from Lucknow
India MPs 1980–1984
India MPs 1984–1989
India MPs 1989–1991
Indian National Congress politicians from Uttar Pradesh
Janata Dal politicians
Lok Sabha members from Uttar Pradesh
People from Kanpur
Bharatiya Janata Party politicians from Uttar Pradesh
Commerce and Industry Ministers of India